A windrow is a row of cut (mown) hay or small grain crop. It is allowed to dry before being baled, combined, or rolled. For hay, the windrow is often formed by a hay rake, which rakes hay that has been cut by a mowing machine or by scythe into a row, or it may naturally form as the hay is mown. For small grain crops which are to be harvested, the windrow is formed by a swather which both cuts the crop and forms the windrow. 

By analogy, the term may also be applied to a row of any other material such as snow, earth or materials for collection.

 Snow windrows are created by snow plows when clearing roads of snow; where this blocks driveways the windrow may require removal.  Snow windrowed to the centre of the street can be removed by a snow blower and truck. In preparing a pond or lake for ice cutting, the snow on top of the ice, which slows freezing, might be scraped off and windrowed.
 Earth windrows may be formed by graders when grading earthworks or dirt roads
 Leaf windrows may be required for municipal collection.
 Fossil windrows are a grouping of fossils that have been deposited together as a result of turbulence or wave action in a marine or freshwater environment. Fossils of similar shape and size are commonly found grouped or sorted together as a result of separation based on weight and shape.
 Seaweed windrows form on sea or lake surfaces because of cylindrical Langmuir circulation just under the surface caused by wind action.

Windrow composting is a large scale vermicomposting system where garden and other biodegradable waste is shredded, mixed and windrowed for composting.

See also
 Windrow composting
 Windrow Formation

References

Agricultural terminology
Snow removal